Land steward may refer to:

 Environmental stewardship, responsible use and protection of the natural environment through conservation and sustainable practices
 Land stewardship, caring for a piece of land regardless of its ownership

See also
 Jitō (地頭), medieval land stewards in Japan